BonWorth is an American retail clothing chain based in Hendersonville, North Carolina.

Founder Loren Wells started BonWorth in 1966 in Hendersonville, and expanded throughout the 1980s. Mr. Wells, the sixth owner of Seely Castle, sold the company in 2013 and has retired to Asheville NC. By 1992, it had 65 stores in 28 states, and by 2007, it had more than 290. Its clothing lines are targeted at women 50 and older.

On August 16, 2019, BonWorth filed for Chapter 11 bankruptcy protection.

References

External links

Clothing retailers of the United States
Companies based in North Carolina
American companies established in 1966
Retail companies established in 1966
1966 establishments in North Carolina
Hendersonville, North Carolina
Companies that filed for Chapter 11 bankruptcy in 2019